Desulfurella acetivorans is a thermophilic acetate-oxidizing sulfur-reducing eubacterium. It is Gram-negative, short rod-shaped, motile, with a single polar flagellum.

References

Further reading

External links
LPSN

Type strain of Desulfurella acetivorans at BacDive -  the Bacterial Diversity Metadatabase

Campylobacterota
Bacteria described in 1993